Windmill Hill is an historic house on Windmill Hill Road in Dublin, New Hampshire.  Built in 1934, it is a fine example of Colonial Revival architecture, built as a summer house in the style of a traditional New England farmhouse.  The house was listed on the National Register of Historic Places in 1983.

Description and history
Windmill Hill is located in a rural setting of southeastern Dublin, on the south side of Windmill Hill Road. It is a -story wood-frame structure built in a U shape with gabled roofs and shingled exterior. A rubblestone terrace wall provides a level grassy area behind the house. Its windows are six-over-six sash throughout, and there are gabled dormers piercing the roof of the central section.

The house was designed by Boston architect Thomas Byrd Epps, and built in 1934 for Priscilla Prince Whitney.  Originally built as a summer residence, it has been weatherized for year-round occupation.  At the time of its National Register listing in 1983, it was still owned by the Whitney family.

See also
National Register of Historic Places listings in Cheshire County, New Hampshire

References

Houses on the National Register of Historic Places in New Hampshire
Houses in Dublin, New Hampshire
National Register of Historic Places in Dublin, New Hampshire